Philippe Manœuvre (born 19 June 1954) is a French music journalist.

He has been a radio and television presenter, specialized in rock music. He has been editor-in-chief for the magazine Métal Hurlant and was the editor-in-chief of the music monthly Rock & Folk. from 1993 to 2017. Since 2008, he was member of the jury of a reality show called Nouvelle Star on M6.

Bibliography 

 Philippe Manœuvre, L'Enfant du rock, Paris, Le Livre de Poche, coll. « Ldp Littérature », 15 octobre 1990.
 Philippe Manœuvre, Dur à cuir.
 Philippe Manœuvre, Stoned : 20 ans de confidences avec les Rolling Stones.
 Philippe Manœuvre, Rock'n'Roll : la discothèque idéale : 101 disques qui ont changé le monde, Albin Michel, 2006
 Philippe Manœuvre, Rock'n'Roll : la discothèque idéale 2 : 101 disques à écouter avant la fin du monde, Albin Michel, 2011
 Philippe Manœuvre, Michael Jackson, Filipacchi, 1988
 Philippe Manœuvre, James Brown, Éditions du Chêne, 2007
 Philippe Manœuvre, Rock, Éditions Harper Collins, 2018

Collaborative works 

 Philippe Manœuvre & Luc Cornillon au dessin, Antisocial, Humanoïdes associés, 1983
 Philippe Manœuvre & Luc Cornillon, La loi et Claude Dallas. (First radio comics broadcast in 1983 including in the radio show En Terre étrangère)
 Philippe Manœuvre & Michel Polnareff, Polnareff par Polnareff.
 Philippe Manœuvre & Joey Starr, Mauvaise Réputation.
 Philippe Manœuvre & Thierry Guitard, Être rock, Tana
 Philippe Manœuvre, Philippe Lacoche & Christian Authier, Lady B, Le Castor Astral
 Philippe Manoeuvre, Les enfers du Rock, Paris, Éditions Tana, 71 p.
 Philippe Manœuvre, Agenda être rock 2010, Paris, Tana Editions, août 2009.
 Philippe Manœuvre, Philippe Manœuvre présente : Rock français, de Johnny à BB Brunes, 123 albums essentiels, Hoëbeke, octobre 2010

References

External links

1954 births
Living people
French male journalists
French radio presenters
French television presenters
French male non-fiction writers
People from Marne (department)